The South American Business Forum, also known as 'SABF', is an annual conference that takes place at the Instituto Tecnológico de Buenos Aires in Buenos Aires, Argentina. The forum aims, through dialogue and the interaction between current leaders and future leaders, to make a contribution to the sustainable development of South America and the world.

The South American Business Forum was founded in 2005, and has been organized annually since then by students of the Instituto Tecnológico de Buenos Aires. The event gathers 100 university students from all around the world and 40 prominent international leaders from the academical, financial, political and social spheres.

Meetings 

In the SABF's past 17 meetings, more than a thousand students from over 62 different nationalities have participated. Students from universities such as Harvard University, Massachusetts Institute of Technology, London School of Economics and Universidad Autónoma de Madrid, among others have participated of the forum. Doug Casey (American-born economist and best-selling financial author), Viktor Klima (Former Chancellor of Austria), Nabeel Goheer, (Global Coordinator - Youth Entrepreneurship Development, International Labour Organization), Félix Luna (Argentinian Writer and Historian), Alexander Laszlo (systems scientist), Zino Haro (American-born entrepreneur, member of the World Economic Forum), Marcella Germano (Eisenhower Fellow), and Guy Sorman (President, Sorman Editions) are among those who have taken part of the event.

External links 
SABF Official website
SABF Official Blog

References 

Business conferences
Foreign trade of Argentina
Organizations established in 2005
Annual events in Argentina
Recurring events established in 2005
2005 establishments in Argentina
Winter events in Argentina